The 2019 Southeast Asian Games, officially known as the 30th Southeast Asian Games, were held in the Philippines, from 30 November 2019 to 11 December 2019.

With 56 sports and 530 events, a total of 1,784 medals were awarded.

Archery

Recurve

Compound

Arnis

Men

Livestick

Padded stick

Anyo

Women

Livestick

Padded stick

Anyo

Athletics

Men's events

Women's events

Mixed

Badminton

Baseball

Basketball

Beach handball

Billiards and snooker

Men

Women

Bowling

Men

Women

Mixed

Boxing

Men

Women

Canoeing

Canoeing & kayaking

Traditional boat racing

Chess

Cycling

BMX

Mountain biking

Road cycling

Dancesport

Standard

Latin American

Duathlon

Esports

PC

Console

Mobile

Fencing

Men

Women

References

2019 Southeast Asian Games